Natraj Bhuban Behera (born 28 May 1988) is an Indian cricketer who served as the captain of Odisha cricket team. Under his able leadership East Zone won its first Duleep Trophy championship of 2011-12 defeating Central Zone. Next year East Zone repeated the same by winning the Duleep Trophy for the second time in a row by defeating West Zone. He was the captain of Western Samurais Rourkela in OPL-1; the team that won the inaugural edition and he led Baitarani side in OPL-2 played in 2013.

References

1988 births
Living people
People from Rourkela
Indian cricketers
Odisha cricketers
East Zone cricketers
Cricketers from Odisha